Christina Aguilera (born 1980) is an American singer, songwriter, actress, and television personality.

Christina Aguilera may also refer to:

 Christina Aguilera (album), her self-titled 1999 debut studio album
 Simply Christina Aguilera, commonly referred to as Christina Aguilera, the 2007 debut fragrance from her perfume brand Christina Aguilera Fragrances